The Queen's Laundry Bath House is a ruinous structure in Yellowstone National Park. The log building sits on the edge of the Queen's Laundry thermal feature in the Lower Geyser Basin. The water at this location is somewhat cooler than the norm, allowing early tourists to bathe.  Begun by Yellowstone park superintendent Philetus Norris, the bath house was intended to have two rooms and a dirt-covered roof, but was never completed. Begun in 1881, it may be the oldest extant park visitor structure in the National Park Service system.

The ruins are located near the western end of Sentinel Meadows on a travertine mound formed by Queen's Laundry Spring. The log walls were vee-notched. The roof structure is incomplete and gradually deteriorating, and was intended to be covered with earth.. The interior comprises two rooms of approximately equal size, which are in the process of gradually being covered by hot springs deposits.

In his 1881 annual report,  Superintendent Norris proposed the construction of the bath house for public use. After the structure was partly built, Superintendent Patrick H. Conger took over management and declined to pursue its completion. The park proposed removing it entirely in 1964, but opted to retain it as the only example of a park structure from Yellowstone's early period of civilian management.

References

External links

 at the National Park Service's NRHP database

Rustic architecture in Wyoming
National Register of Historic Places in Teton County, Wyoming
Log buildings and structures on the National Register of Historic Places in Wyoming
National Register of Historic Places in Yellowstone National Park
1881 establishments in Wyoming Territory
Government buildings completed in 1881
Unfinished buildings and structures in the United States
Public baths on the National Register of Historic Places
Buildings and structures in Yellowstone National Park in Wyoming